Griswold Community School District is a rural public school district headquartered in Griswold, Iowa, serving sections of Cass, Montgomery, and Pottawattamie counties.

Communities in its service area are Griswold, Elliott, Grant, and Lewis.

Schools
The district operates two schools on one campus in Griswold:
Griswold Elementary School
Griswold Middle and Senior High School

Griswold High School

Athletics
The Tigers compete in the Corner Conference in the following sports:

Cross Country (boys and girls)
Volleyball 
Football 
Basketball (boys and girls)
Wrestling 
Track and Field (boys and girls)
Golf (boys and girls)
Baseball 
Softball

Enrollment

See also
List of school districts in Iowa
List of high schools in Iowa

References

External links
 Griswold Community School District

School districts in Iowa
Education in Cass County, Iowa
Education in Montgomery County, Iowa
Education in Pottawattamie County, Iowa